Sybilla Maria Dekker (born 23 March 1942) is a retired Dutch politician of the People's Party for Freedom and Democracy (VVD) and businesswoman. She was granted the honorary title of Minister of State on 22 June 2018.

A member of the People's Party for Freedom and Democracy (VVD), she was minister of Housing, Spatial Planning and the Environment in the second and third Balkenende cabinets. She resigned on 21 September 2006, after the publication of the Dutch Safety Board report about the fire that occurred in 2005 at the Amsterdam Airport Schiphol, killing 11 people.

Since 2008, she has been the domestic partner of former Minister of Foreign Affairs Ben Bot.

Decorations

References

External links

Official
  S.M. (Sybilla) Dekker Parlement & Politiek

 

 

 

 

 

 

1942 births
Living people
Dutch corporate directors
Dutch management consultants
Dutch nonprofit directors
Dutch nonprofit executives
Dutch trade association executives
Dutch social workers
20th-century Dutch businesswomen
20th-century Dutch businesspeople
Ministers of Housing and Spatial Planning of the Netherlands
Ministers of State (Netherlands)
Officers of the Order of Orange-Nassau
People's Party for Freedom and Democracy politicians
People from Alkmaar
Politicians from The Hague
Utrecht University alumni
Women government ministers of the Netherlands
Social workers
20th-century Dutch civil servants
21st-century Dutch civil servants
21st-century Dutch women politicians
21st-century Dutch politicians